Jerome Johnson Richardson Sr. (July 18, 1936 – March 1, 2023) was an American businessman, football player, and owner in the National Football League (NFL). A native of Spring Hope, North Carolina, he played college football at Wofford and twice was a Little All-America selection. After graduating he played two seasons in the NFL with the Baltimore Colts. 

Richardson later became a businessman, operating a Hardee's location, founding Spartan Foods, and serving as the CEO at Flagstar. He founded the Carolina Panthers, and served as its owner from its first season in 1995 until selling the franchise in 2018.

Early life and college
Richardson was born in Spring Hope, North Carolina. After graduating from Sanford High School in Fayetteville, North Carolina, he went to Wofford College in Spartanburg, South Carolina. Richardson was an Associated Press Little All-American selection in 1957 and 1958. He still holds Wofford's single-game record with 241 receiving yards vs. Newberry in 1956 and is the school's record holder for touchdown receptions in a season (9 in 1958) and in a career (21). As a senior at Wofford, he scored 72 points on nine touchdowns, 12 extra points and two field goals. Richardson called being elected team captain in 1958 the greatest honor he had received. In 1983, he was chosen to Wofford's All-Time Football team as a receiver.

Richardson was active in numerous groups on the Wofford campus; he was a member of Kappa Alpha Order fraternity, President of the Inter-Fraternity Council, and member of the SCA Cabinet. Honors he received while at Wofford included Distinguished Military Student, Scabbard and Blade Military Fraternity, Sigma Delta Psi, Blue Key National Honorary Fraternity, and recognition in Who's Who in American Universities and Colleges.

Professional football
Drafted in the 13th round by the defending world champion Baltimore Colts, Richardson played two seasons in the NFL, earning Colt Rookie of the Year honors in 1959. He caught a touchdown pass in the 1959 NFL Championship Game from quarterback Johnny Unitas. He was traded from the Colts to the New York Giants for John Guzik on August 3, 1961.

Business
After his NFL career, Richardson used his 1959 NFL championship bonus with the help of friend and former Wofford quarterback Charles Bradshaw to open the first Hardee's franchise in Spartanburg. The two ended up owning the Hardee's business 50/50. The business expanded rapidly under his hands-on management style. From his headquarters in Spartanburg, he co-founded Spartan Foods, which was the first franchisee of Hardee's. He later was the CEO of Flagstar, which was the sixth largest food service company in the United States, controlling 2,500 restaurants and providing jobs for 100,000 employees. He retired in 1995.

Carolina Panthers

On October 26, 1993, Richardson became the first former NFL player since George Halas to become an owner when the Carolina Panthers were unanimously awarded the NFL's 29th franchise. The Panthers have represented not only Charlotte and North Carolina, but the surrounding region; the area has benefited from the franchise's success.

Richardson was regarded as one of the most powerful NFL owners, alongside Jerry Jones of the Dallas Cowboys and Robert Kraft of the New England Patriots, respectively. Richardson played a role in locking out the NFL players in 2011 and in negotiating a new players agreement.

For the most part Richardson stayed in the background and rarely interfered in the Panthers' day-to-day operations. For instance, when he fired George Seifert after the 2001 season (in which the Panthers went 1–15), he went nine years before holding another press conference at which he took questions from the media—when he announced that John Fox's contract would not be renewed.

One of the few times in which he directly intervened in football matters came in the 2014–15 offseason, when he refused to re-sign player Greg Hardy in the wake of domestic violence events involving Hardy. Richardson said that he made the decision not to do so because "we do the right things."

It had long been presumed that Richardson intended to have his sons, Mark and Jon, inherit the team. However both abruptly resigned before the 2009 season, reportedly at the behest of Richardson and Jon Richardson died of cancer in 2013. On January 16, 2013, WBTV in Charlotte reported that Jerry Richardson wanted the team to be sold after he died, but presumably only to someone who would keep the team and jobs in Charlotte.

In the 2015 season, Richardson's Panthers reached Super Bowl 50 on February 7, 2016, after losing only one game all season. The Panthers fell to the Denver Broncos with a score of 24–10. At the company's expense, the Panthers transported and housed a majority of their employees at the Super Bowl.

As Panthers majority owner, Richardson was said to be a "champion of diversity", with African-American Cam Newton as starting quarterback and Hispanic Ron Rivera as head coach.

Controversy and sale 
On December 17, 2017, Sports Illustrated reported, based on anonymous sources who were reneging on signed settlement agreements, that "at least four former Panthers employees have received 'significant' monetary settlements due to inappropriate workplace comments and conduct by owner Jerry Richardson, including sexually suggestive language and behavior, and on at least one occasion directing a racial slur at an African-American Panthers scout.

On the same day, it was announced that Richardson intended to sell the Panthers franchise at the conclusion of the 2017 season. After great interest from the market, in May 2018 Richardson finalized a sale to billionaire and then Pittsburgh Steelers minority owner David Tepper for an NFL record sales price of $2.2 billion. The deal was approved by NFL owners on May 22, 2018. On June 28, 2018, Richardson was fined $2.75 million for the alleged workplace misconduct.

A  statue of Richardson holding a football and flanked by two panthers was unveiled at Bank of America Stadium in 2016; it was a gift from the Panthers LLC minority partners to Richardson for his 80th birthday.  On June 10, 2020, the statue was removed.

Personal life

Richardson was hospitalized in Charlotte at Carolinas Medical Center in early December 2008, one month after receiving a pacemaker. He had a history of heart trouble and had undergone quadruple bypass surgery in 2002. Two days later he was placed on a donor waiting list for a new heart. He received a new heart on February 1, 2009, and fully recovered from the transplant operation.

Richardson and businessman Hugh McColl purchased the naming rights to the University of North Carolina at Charlotte's football field in 2011. The stadium was named Jerry Richardson Stadium in 2013 after an additional $10 million donation.

In 2000, Richardson was elected into the North Carolina Sports Hall of Fame. In 2006 and 2015, he was elected to the South Carolina Business and Sports Halls of Fame, respectively. In 2016 he funded the Rosalind Sallenger Richardson Center for the Arts, in honor of his wife of over sixty years, on the Wofford College campus. In 2017, he funded Wofford's state-of-the-art Jerry Richardson Indoor Stadium.

In 2021, he donated $150 million to Wofford College. It is the largest gift in Wofford's history. The gift is designated for the college's endowment with a focus on need-based financial scholarships and experiences for Wofford students. His gifts to Wofford to date, including capital improvements, exceed $260 million. According to Richardson, Wofford has been the greatest influence in success in his life, with no other influence "even close".

Richardson died at home in Charlotte on March 1, 2023, at age 86.

References

1936 births
2023 deaths
People from Nash County, North Carolina
Players of American football from North Carolina
American football wide receivers
Wofford Terriers football players
Baltimore Colts players
Businesspeople from North Carolina
Carolina Panthers owners
National Football League controversies
American food company founders
Heart transplant recipients